St. Mary's Bay Academy (SMBA) is a secondary school located in Weymouth, Nova Scotia. SMBA is part of the Tri-County Regional School Board. It is the only English high school in the municipality of Clare. It was formerly known as Clare District High.

House System 

The School currently uses a house system with names based on the schools initials, SMBA. The names of the houses are Stellar Sharks, Bold Barracudas, Mighty Marlins, and Atomic Anglers.

References

External links
SMBA
Tri-County Regional School Board

High schools in Nova Scotia
Schools in Digby County, Nova Scotia